Buckna is a small village four miles east of Broughshane in County Antrim, Northern Ireland. It is part of Mid and East Antrim District Council and is close to Slemish mountain.

References

External links
 Buckna Presbyterian Church
 Ballymena Borough Council

Villages in County Antrim